Bottom Dollar Food was an American soft-discount grocery chain. It was a subsidiary of Delhaize America, the U.S. division of international food retailer Delhaize Group. Its headquarters was in Salisbury, North Carolina.

Bottom Dollar Food sold an assortment of both private brands and national brands at low prices. To curtail costs, the grocer offered customers the option to buy bags to sack their groceries, and also used alternative display and stocking techniques, such as cut cases on shelves.

History
Bottom Dollar was created by parent Delhaize America at the same time as the upscale chain Bloom in 2004. The first Bottom Dollar Food opened in High Point, North Carolina, on September 21, 2005, and eventually there were around 30 stores in North Carolina, Virginia and Maryland before the expansion into other states in 2010.

Beginning in October 2010 in King of Prussia, PA, Bottom Dollar Food opened 19 stores in the Delaware Valley and Lehigh Valley areas. The first store in Philadelphia was opened on April 15, 2011.  Some industry analysts believed those markets were already overstored with discount competitors such as Aldi, PriceRite and Save-A-Lot.  A Philadelphia area competitor was quoted as saying
“It’s always challenging to be the last guy to get in the game, but unlike the other limited assortment discounters already in the market, Bottom Dollar really didn’t present itself as a deep discounter. I believe its mix of private label products with significant branded offerings sent a confusing message to shoppers. Were they trying to become a price-driven operator with decent but not great retails, or a small supermarket with good prices? Their message never seemed to connect.”

In January 2012, Delhaize announced that it would close six and convert 22 others of the original southern Bottom Dollar stores to Food Lion supermarkets as part of a restructuring; the Bloom brand was also retired.  The restructuring resulted in the Bottom Dollar name disappearing outside of Pennsylvania and New Jersey.

In late February 2012, Bottom Dollar expanded into Pittsburgh and Youngstown, Ohio, neither of which have the parent Food Lion chain and are dominated by Giant Eagle. In these markets, Bottom Dollar also competed with various SuperValu-supplied stores (including low-price Save-A-Lot), Aldi, and Walmart.

In spring 2013, in order to cut costs, Bottom Dollar started to require a quarter to use a shopping cart. When the quarter was inserted, the cart would be unlocked from the other carts. When the cart was returned, the customer was refunded their coin, effectively costing the customer only the time to return the cart. This was a practice also used by Aldi. Though ubiquitous in Europe, where both Aldi and Bottom Dollar's parent company Delhaize Group are headquartered, it is rare in American stores which often have employees return carts left in parking areas.

In August 2014, it was learned that Delhaize wanted to sell all 66 of its remaining Bottom Dollar stores  Forty-six of the stores were located in the Delaware Valley and Lehigh Valley in southern New Jersey and Pennsylvania, and 20 in the Pittsburgh-Youngstown corridor of Pennsylvania and Northeast Ohio. Bottom Dollar stores were reported to range in size from 16,848 square feet (Ambler, PA) to 30,352 square feet (Catasaqua Road, Allentown, PA), an average store being about 20,000 square feet, with weekly sales volumes from $296,800 (North Broad Street, Philadelphia, PA) to $103,000 (East Windsor, NJ), the average sales being around $150,000 weekly. Although 10 of the New Jersey and eastern Pennsylvania stores were company-owned, most stores were leased, with leasehold rents are in the $10–12 per square foot range.

On November 5, 2014, Delhaize Group announced they were selling the Bottom Dollar chain to Aldi, with plans to close the stores by early 2015. The stores were scheduled to close on January 15, 2015, but closed three days early on January 12 due to all the stores selling out their inventory quicker than expected. Aldi hasn't announced whether or not it will reopen any of the locations, although Pittsburgh mayor Bill Peduto is reportedly in talks with Aldi to reopen a Bottom Dollar location as an Aldi in the Pittsburgh neighborhood of Garfield, as there is no other grocery store in the neighborhood. Delhaize finalized the sale of the shuttered locations to Aldi on March 27, 2015, with plans to reopen 30 of the locations purchased as Aldi, including the aforementioned location in Pittsburgh's Garfield section. The remaining locations—all of which are near existing Aldi locations—will either be flipped or sublet by Aldi.

Store brands and competitors
The stores sold the My Essentials and Hannaford private brands.

Bottom Dollar Food competed with other discount supermarket chains - including PriceRite, Save-A-Lot, Aldi, and C-Town Supermarkets.

References

External links
 Bottom Dollar Food Official website

Discount stores of the United States
Supermarkets of the United States
Defunct companies based in North Carolina
Retail companies established in 2005
Retail companies disestablished in 2015
2005 establishments in North Carolina
2015 disestablishments in California
2015 disestablishments in North Carolina
Economy of the Eastern United States